Falkenstein Castle near Bad Emstal is a castle in Hesse, Germany.

Hill castles